Saptha pretiosa is a moth in the family Choreutidae. It was described by Francis Walker in 1866. It is found on Java in Indonesia.

References

Choreutidae
Moths described in 1866